Right on Track is a Disney Channel Original Movie. It was produced by Don Schain, directed by Duwayne Dunham, and written by Sally Nemeth and Bruce Graham. The movie debuted on March 21, 2003 on Disney Channel in the United States.

Plot 

Based on a true story about two sisters who came out on top of a man's sport, the story is based on Courtney and Erica Enders, two sisters who get into junior drag racing and make it all the way to the top. The two sisters fight a battle of fellow racers who are against having girls race with them; therefore, it pushes them harder to compete against their competition. Erica becomes stressed when her racing life becomes mixed with her social life and academic goals, and decided to quit racing, until she realizes racing is what she truly wants to do. Finally towards the end of their teen years the Enders sisters come out on top to win the NHRA Junior Dragster national title. They continue to race throughout high school and college, and still do so today.

Cast
 Beverley Mitchell as Erica Enders
Ruby Chase O'Neil as Erica Enders, Age 4
Briana Shipley as Erica Enders, Age 8
 Brie Larson as Courtney Enders
Stefania Barr as Courtney Enders, Age 4
 Jon Lindstrom as Gregg Enders 
 Jodi Russell as Janet Lee Enders 
 Marcus Toji as Randy Jones
Lenny Betancourt as Randy Jones, Age 9
 Eric Jacobs as Bailey Brother
 Janice Power as Art Teacher
 J. Scott Bronson as Father (as Scott Bronson)
 Joey Miyashima as Mr. Jones 
 Radley Dutson as Jordy Knowlton 
 William Osborn as Rusty Knowlton
 Teresa Richardson as Volleyball Coach

The Enders sisters also made appearances as driving and stunt doubles for Mitchell and Larson.

Legacy 

Erica turned professional in 2005, participating in the Pro Stock class of the NHRA Powerade Drag Racing Series, and on July 1, 2012, became the first woman to win in the class when she defeated Greg Anderson in a live televised final. Erica won the 2014 Pro Stock championship, defeating Jason Line in a winner-take-all final on November 16, 2014, at the NHRA Finals at Pomona. She was also named US "Racer of the Year" for 2014 by Autosport magazine.  Erica clinched her second consecutive Pro Stock championship on November 1, 2015, at The Strip at Las Vegas Motor Speedway. Erica won her 3rd World Championship in November 2019 beating Chris McGaha in round 2 of the AAA World Finals in Pomona, CA, and repeated the honour in 2020.

References

External links

Disney Channel Original Movie films
American auto racing films
Films set in Texas
2003 television films
2003 films
2003 drama films
Films about women's sports
Films directed by Duwayne Dunham
Drag racing
2000s English-language films
2000s American films